Many political appointees of Donald Trump, the 45th president of the United States, resigned or were dismissed. The record-setting turnover rate in the first year of the Trump Administration has been noted in various publications. Several Trump appointees, including National Security Advisor Michael Flynn, White House Chief of Staff Reince Priebus, White House Communications Director Anthony Scaramucci, and Secretary of Health and Human Services Tom Price have had the shortest service tenures in the history of their respective offices.

Trump justified the instability, saying: "We have acting people. The reason they are acting is because I'm seeing how I like them, and I'm liking a lot of them very, very much. There are people who have done a bad job, and I let them go. If you call that turmoil, I don't call that turmoil. I say that is being smart. That's what we do."

For comprehensiveness, the list below includes, in addition to dismissals and resignations, routine job changes such as promotions (e.g. Gina Haspel from CIA Deputy Director to Director), officials moving to a comparable position (e.g. John F. Kelly from Secretary of Homeland Security to Chief of Staff), and acting or temporary officials being replaced by permanent ones. The list does not include many lower level positions, however, such as that of executive director of the United States Interagency Council on Homelessness, Matthew Doherty, dismissed in November 2019, without a replacement to lead the council that was created in 1987. But some less prominent officials are listed because their departure was newsworthy.

Also listed are the officials who resigned in the aftermath of the 2021 United States Capitol attack, well into the presidential transition, when their term would have ended soon anyway.

Color key
Color key:

 Denotes appointees serving in an acting capacity.

 Denotes appointees to an office which has since been abolished

Executive Office of the President

Office of the Vice President

Department of Agriculture

Department of Commerce

Department of Defense

Department of Education

Department of Energy

Department of Health and Human Services

Department of Homeland Security

Department of Housing and Urban Development

Department of the Interior

Department of Justice

Department of Labor

Department of State

Department of Transportation

Department of the Treasury

Department of Veterans Affairs

Intelligence community

Independent agencies

Banks

In the aftermath of the 2021 Capitol attack

Dozens of Trump administration officeholders resigned in reaction to the Capitol storming, even though their terms in office would expire fourteen days later with the inauguration of President Biden. Some senior officials, however, decided against resigning in order to ensure an "orderly transition of power" to the incoming Biden administration, out of concern that Trump would replace them with loyalist lower-level staffers who they feared could carry out illegal orders given by him.
Stephanie Grisham, the chief of staff for First Lady Melania Trump
Sarah Matthews, the White House Deputy Press Secretary
Anna Cristina Niceta Lloyd "Rickie",  White House Social Secretary resigned in protest on the day of the storming of the Capitol. 
Chris Liddell, White House Deputy Chief of Staff 
Elaine Chao, United States Secretary of Transportation became the first cabinet member to announce her resignation, effective January 11.
Betsy DeVos, United States Secretary of Education also cited the Capitol Hill incident. US Senator Elizabeth Warren (D-MA)  criticized DeVos and Chao for resigning rather than voting to invoke the 25th Amendment to remove Trump from office.
Elinore F. McCance-Katz, Assistant Secretary of HHS for Mental health and Substance Use 
Mick Mulvaney, Trump's former chief of staff and the administration's special envoy to Northern Ireland. Upon his exit, Mulvaney said, "I can't do it. I can't stay ... Those who choose to stay, and I have talked with some of them, are choosing to stay because they're worried the President might put someone worse in." He also said Trump "wasn't the same as he was eight months ago."
Eric Dreiband, Assistant Attorney General for the Civil Rights Division  
Chad Wolf, Acting United States Secretary of Homeland Security resigned on January 11, saying it was "warranted by recent events, including" recent court decisions ruling that Trump's appointment of Wolf as acting secretary violated the Federal Vacancies Reform Act of 1998. 
Alex Azar, United States Secretary of Health and Human Services  announced his resignation January 15, stating that it was due to the Capitol riots and stressing the need for a peaceful transfer of power. However, this resignation would only become effective starting January 20, the day President-elect Biden would be sworn in as president.
Jason Schmid, Senior GOP aide on the House Armed Services Committee 
Tyler B. Goodspeed, Acting Chairman of the White House Council of Economic Advisors
John Costello, Deputy Assistant Secretary for Intelligence and Security in the Commerce Department

Three members of the National Security Council resigned prematurely. 
Robert C. O'Brien, National Security Advisor (United States)
Matthew Pottinger, Deputy National Security Advisor (United States) 
Ryan Tully, Senior Director on Russian and European Affairs for the National Security Council

Five senior officials at the Federal Aviation Administration (FAA) resigned in protest.
Arjun Garg, Acting Deputy Administrator of the Federal Aviation Administrator,
Brianna Manzelli, assistant administrator for communications; 
Kirk Shaffer, associate administrator for airports; 
Bailey Edwards, assistant administrator for policy, international affairs and environment 
Andrew Giacini, governmental affairs adviser, performing the duties of the assistant administrator for government and industry affairs

See also
 List of Donald Trump nominees who have withdrawn
 List of short-tenure Donald Trump political appointments

Notes

References

External references 

 Brookings Institution: Tracking turnover in the Trump administration
 ABC News: A list of officials who have left the Trump administration

Presidency of Donald Trump
Donald Trump
Trump administration cabinet members
2010s politics-related lists
 Dismissals
Donald Trump-related lists
Trump administration controversies
Lists of resignations